Forest Hill Cemetery or variation may also refer to:

United States
Forest Hill Calvary Cemetery, Kansas City, Missouri
Forest Hill Cemetery (Greencastle, Indiana)
Forest Hill Cemetery (Ann Arbor, Michigan)
Forest Hill Cemetery (Utica, New York)
Forest Hill Cemetery (Memphis, Tennessee)
Forest Hill Cemetery (Madison, Wisconsin)
Forest Hills Cemetery, Jamaica Plain, Boston, Massachusetts

See also
 Forest Hills (disambiguation)
 Forest Hill (disambiguation)